Sir John Boorman  (born 18 January 1933) is a British filmmaker. He is best known for directing feature films such as Point Blank (1967), Hell in the Pacific (1968), Deliverance (1972), Zardoz (1974), Exorcist II: The Heretic (1977), Excalibur (1981), The Emerald Forest (1985), Hope and Glory (1987), The General (1998), The Tailor of Panama (2001) and Queen and Country (2014).

Boorman has directed 22 films and received five Academy Award nominations, twice for Best Director (for Deliverance, and Hope and Glory). He is also credited with creating the first Academy Award screeners to promote The Emerald Forest. In 2004, Boorman received the BAFTA Fellowship for lifetime achievement from the British Academy of Film and Television Arts. In January 2022, Boorman received a knighthood.

Early life
Boorman was born in Shepperton, Middlesex, England, the son of pub landlord George Boorman and his wife Ivy (née Chapman). George Boorman was of Dutch parentage. He was educated at the Salesian School in Chertsey, Surrey.

Career
Boorman was conscripted for military service and became a clerical instructor in the British Army. He did not serve in the Korean War, but once faced court-martial for "seducing a soldier from the course of his duty" by criticising the war to his trainees; this was abandoned when Boorman showed that The Times was the source of all his comments. After Army service he worked as a drycleaner and journalist in the late 1950s. He ran the newsrooms at Southern Television in Southampton and Dover before moving into television documentary filmmaking, eventually becoming head of the BBC's Bristol-based Documentary Unit. In 1963 he wrote and directed a documentary about professional football, "Six Days to Saturday" which focused on a week in the life of Swindon Town, who were then in England's second division.

Having caught the attention of a producer, David Deutsch, Boorman was offered the chance to direct a film aimed at repeating the success of A Hard Day's Night (directed by Richard Lester in 1964): Catch Us If You Can (1965) is about another pop group, the Dave Clark Five. While it was not as successful commercially as Lester's film was, it drew good reviews from distinguished critics such as Pauline Kael and Dilys Powell, and smoothed Boorman's way into the film industry. 

Boorman was drawn to Hollywood for the opportunity to make larger-scale films and in Point Blank (1967), based on a novel by Richard Stark ( a pen name of Donald E. Westlake), he brought a stranger's vision to the decaying fortress of Alcatraz and the proto-hippy world of the West Coast of the United States. Lee Marvin gave the then-unknown director his full support, telling MGM that he deferred all his approvals on the project to Boorman.

After Point Blank, Boorman worked with Lee Marvin and Toshiro Mifune on the robinsonade of Hell in the Pacific (1968), which tells a fable of two representative soldiers stranded together on an island.

After returning to the United Kingdom, Boorman made Leo the Last (US/UK, 1970). This film exhibited the influence of Federico Fellini and even starred a Fellini regular, Marcello Mastroianni. It won Boorman a Best Director award at the Cannes Film Festival.

Boorman achieved much greater resonance with Deliverance (US, 1972, adapted from a novel by James Dickey), depicting the ordeal of four urban men, played by Jon Voight, Burt Reynolds, Ronny Cox and Ned Beatty, who encounter danger from an unexpected quarter while whitewater-rafting through the Appalachian backwoods. The film became Boorman's first true box office success and earned him several award nominations.

At the beginning of the 1970s, Boorman planned to film The Lord of the Rings and corresponded about his plans with the author, J. R. R. Tolkien. Ultimately the production proved too costly, though some elements and themes can be seen in Excalibur (1981).

A wide variety of films followed. Zardoz (1974), starring Sean Connery, is a post-apocalyptic science fiction piece, set in the 23rd century where sex is divided into two worlds. According to the director's film commentary, the "Zardoz world" is on a collision course with an "effete" eternal society.

Boorman was selected as director for Exorcist II: The Heretic (USA, 1977), a move that surprised the industry given his dislike of the original film. Boorman declared: "Not only did I not want to do the original film, I told the head of Warner Brothers, John Calley, [that] I'd be happy if he didn't produce the film too." The original script by a Broadway playwright, William Goodhart, was intellectual and ambitious, being concerned with the metaphysical nature of the battle between good and evil, and influenced by the writings of Catholic theologian Pierre Teilhard De Chardin, "I found It extremely compelling. It was based on Chardin's intoxicating idea that biological evolution was the first step In God's plan, starting with inert rock, and culminating in humankind." Despite Boorman's continued rewriting throughout shooting, the film was rendered incomprehensible. The film, released in June 1977, was a critical disaster but a moderate box office success. Boorman was denounced by William Peter Blatty, the author of the original novel The Exorcist, and by William Friedkin, director of the first Exorcist film. Boorman later admitted that his approach to the film was a mistake. The Heretic is often considered not just the worst film of The Exorcist series, but one of the worst films of all time.

Excalibur, a long-held dream project of Boorman's, is a retelling of the Arthurian legend, based on Le Morte D'Arthur. Boorman cast Nicol Williamson and Helen Mirren over their protests, as the two disliked each other intensely, but Boorman felt that their mutual antagonism would enhance their presentations0of the characters they were playing. The production was based in the Republic of Ireland, where Boorman had settled. For the film he employed all of his children as actors and crew (several of Boorman's later films have also been "family business" productions). The film, one of the first to be produced by Orion Films, was a moderate success.

The Emerald Forest (1985) saw Boorman cast his son Charley Boorman as an eco-warrior in a rainforest adventure that included commercially required elements – action and near-nudity – with authentic anthropological detail. Rospo Pallenberg's original screenplay was adapted into a book of the same name by award-winning author Robert Holdstock. Because the film's distributor faced business troubles that year, the film did not receive a traditional "For Your Consideration" advertising campaign for the 1985 Academy Awards, despite positive critical reviews. Boorman took the initiative to promote the film himself by making VHS copies available for no charge to Academy members at several Los Angeles-area video rental stores. Boorman's idea later became ubiquitous during Hollywood's award season, and by the 2010s, more than a million Oscar screeners were mailed to Academy members each year. However, Emerald Forest itself received no nominations from Boorman's strategy.

Hope and Glory (1987, UK) is his most autobiographical movie to date, a retelling of his childhood in London during The Blitz. Produced by Goldcrest Films, with Hollywood financing the film, it proved a box office hit in the US, receiving numerous Oscar, BAFTA and Golden Globe nominations. However, his 1990 US-produced comedy about a dysfunctional family, Where the Heart Is, was a major flop.

When his friend David Lean died in 1991, Boorman was announced to be taking over direction of Lean's long-planned adaptation of Nostromo, though the production collapsed. Beyond Rangoon (US, 1995) and The Tailor of Panama (US/Ireland, 2000) both explore unique worlds with alien characters stranded and desperate.

Boorman won the Best Director Award at the 1998 Cannes Film Festival for The General, his biopic of Martin Cahill. The film is about a glamorous, yet mysterious, criminal in Dublin who was killed, apparently by the Provisional Irish Republican Army. Boorman himself had been one of Cahill's burglary victims, having the gold record awarded for the score to Deliverance stolen from his home.

Released in 2006, his The Tiger's Tail was a thriller set against the tableau of early 21st century capitalism in Ireland. At the same time, Boorman began work on a long-time pet project of his, a fictional account of the life of Roman Emperor Hadrian (entitled Memoirs of Hadrian), written in the form of a letter from a dying Hadrian to his successor. In the meantime, a re-make/re-interpretation of the classic The Wonderful Wizard Of Oz with Boorman at the helm was announced in August 2009.

In 2007 and 2009 he took part in a series of events and discussions as part of the Arts in Marrakech Festival along with his daughter Katrine Boorman including an event with Kim Cattrall called 'Being Directed'.

In November 2012 he was selected as a President of the main competition jury at the 2012 International Film Festival of Marrakech.

In Autumn 2013 Boorman began shooting Queen and Country, the sequel to his 1987 Oscar-nominated Hope and Glory, using locations in Shepperton and Romania. The film was selected to be screened as part of the Directors' Fortnight section of the 2014 Cannes Film Festival.

John Boorman's debut novel, Crime of Passion, was published in 2016 (by Liberties Press, Dublin), with a French-language edition published by Marest in 2017.

Personal life
Boorman has been a longtime resident of Ireland and lives in Annamoe, County Wicklow, close to the Glendalough twin lakes. According to a 2012 interview, he was recently divorced. By 2020, he was married to his third wife.

He has seven children: Katrine (b. 1958), Telsche (1960-1996), Charles (b. 1966), and Daisy (b. 1966) with his first wife, Christel Kruse, to whom he was married until 1990; and Lola, Lee, and Lily Mae with his second wife, Isabella Weibrecht, whom he married in 1995.

His son, Charley Boorman, has a career as an actor but reached a wider audience when he and actor Ewan McGregor made a televised motorbike trip across Europe, Central Asia, Siberia, Alaska, Canada, and the Midwest US during 2004. His daughter Katrine Boorman (Igrayne in Excalibur) works as an actress in France. 
Another daughter, Telsche, wrote the screenplay for Where the Heart Is. She died of ovarian cancer in 1996 at the age of 36. She had been married to the journalist Lionel Rotcage, the son of French singer Régine, which produced a daughter.

Boorman was appointed Commander of the Order of the British Empire (CBE) in the 1994 Birthday Honours for services to the film industry. In 2004, Boorman was also made a Fellow of BAFTA. Boorman was knighted in the 2022 New Year Honours for services to film.

Awards and nominations
Academy Awards
 Best Picture (1973) (Deliverance) – Nominated
 Best Director (1973) (Deliverance) – Nominated
 Best Picture (1988) (Hope and Glory) – Nominated
 Best Director (1988) (Hope and Glory) – Nominated
 Best Original Screenplay (1988) (Hope and Glory) – Nominated
British Academy Film Awards
 Best Film (1988) (Hope and Glory) – Nominated
 Best Original Screenplay (1988) (Hope and Glory) – Nominated
 BAFTA Fellowship (2004) – Won
Cinema for Peace
 The Cinema for Peace Award for the Most Valuable Film of the Year (2004) (In My Country) – Won
Golden Globe Awards
 Best Director (1973) (Deliverance) – Nominated
 Best Director (1988) (Hope and Glory) – Nominated
 Best Screenplay (1988) (Hope and Glory) – Nominated

Partial filmography

Bibliography
 Boorman, John, with Bill Stair (1974) Zardoz (novel)

References

Further reading

External links
 
 
 

1933 births
Living people
20th-century British Army personnel
BAFTA fellows
BBC television producers
British expatriates in Ireland
British film directors
British film producers
British male film actors
British male screenwriters
British male television actors
British male video game actors
British male voice actors
British people of Dutch descent
Cannes Film Festival Award for Best Director winners
Commanders of the Order of the British Empire
English-language film directors
German-language film directors
Knights Bachelor
Military personnel from Middlesex
People from Shepperton